Bamberga (minor planet designation: 324 Bamberga) is one of the largest asteroids in the asteroid belt. It was discovered by Johann Palisa on 25 February 1892 in Vienna. It is one of the top-20 largest asteroids in the asteroid belt. Apart from the near-Earth asteroid Eros, it was the last asteroid which is ever easily visible with binoculars to be discovered.

Overall Bamberga is the tenth-brightest main-belt asteroid after, in order, Vesta, Pallas, Ceres, Iris, Hebe, Juno, Melpomene, Eunomia and Flora. Its high eccentricity (for comparison 36% higher than that of Pluto), though, means that at most oppositions other asteroids reach higher magnitudes.

Observation

Although its very high orbital eccentricity means its opposition magnitude varies greatly, at a rare opposition near perihelion Bamberga can reach a magnitude of +8.0, which is as bright as Saturn's moon Titan. Such near-perihelion oppositions occur on a regular cycle every twenty-two years, with the last occurring in 2013 and the next in 2035, when attaining magnitude 8.1 on 13 September. Its brightness at these rare near-perihelion oppositions makes Bamberga the brightest C-type asteroid, roughly one magnitude brighter than 10 Hygiea's maximum brightness of around +9.1. At such an opposition Bamberga can in fact be closer to Earth than any main-belt asteroid with magnitude above +9.5, getting as close as 0.78 AU. For comparison, 7 Iris never comes closer than 0.85 AU and 4 Vesta never closer than 1.13 AU (when it becomes visible to the naked eye in a light pollution-free sky).

Characteristics
The 29-hour rotation period is unusually long for an asteroid more than 150 km in diameter. Its spectral class is intermediate between the C-type and P-type asteroids.

10μ radiometric data collected from Kitt Peak in 1975 gave a diameter estimate of 255 km. An occultation of Bamberga was observed on 8 December 1987, and gave a diameter of about 228 km, in agreement with IRAS results. In 1988 a search for satellites or dust orbiting this asteroid was performed using the UH88 telescope at the Mauna Kea Observatories, but the effort came up empty.

References

External links 
 
 

000324
Discoveries by Johann Palisa
Named minor planets
000324
18920225